Nasir Adeeb (born 6 March 1947), is a Pakistani scriptwriter, chiefly working in Punjabi language films of Lollywood.

He holds unasserted world record for writing maximum number of film scripts until date. He also wrote many novels, including an espionage spy novel which was published during his school days. He earned his recognition in the 1970s with his first classical film Wehshi Jatt and subsequently with Maula Jatt, a mass market blockbuster film and with its characters like Noori Natt.
The film became a subject between the government of Pakistan and the filmmakers for its story written by Nasir Adeeb.

The recipient of numerous awards and accordion, including Presidential Pride of Performance, he wrote scripts and dialogues for more than four hundred films and is also credited for introducing "gandasa" genre in films which according to The Diplomat brought significant improvements to the Pakistan film industry during its unsuccessful productions.

Life and background 
He was born to Khatija Begum and Ghulam Hussain in Sargodha on 6 March 1947. He has seven siblings, including five sisters and two brothers. In 1961, he moved to Lahore where he began his film career.

Career 
He started his career in 1971 at Pakistan Television Corporation as an assistant program producer. At that time, his novel titled Aswa was seen in a local newspaper ad for a film claimed to ran without his consent. The incident was referred to judiciary where a civil Judge named Sheikh Abdur Rashid investigated the incident, leading him to become a part of the film and was eventually introduced to the Lollywood. He also wrote a play titled Janam Janam Ki Maili Chadar that premiered on the country's broadcaster and ran for one thousand shows, one of the longest TV shows of Pakistan. His film songs are chiefly sung by Noor Jehan, Pakistani playback singer also referred to as "the queen of melody". As a screenwriter, he wrote The Legend of Maula Jatt film.

Filmography

Awards

References

Notes

External links 
 

1947 births
Living people
People from Sargodha
Pakistani screenwriters
21st-century Pakistani writers
Recipients of the Pride of Performance
Nigar Award winners
21st-century screenwriters